John Miller was a Scottish footballer who played as a left half for Renfrew, Yoker Athletic, Petershill, Clydebank, St Mirren and Scotland.

Miller played with St Mirren for 14 years; as a reserve in 1926 he had no involvement in their successful Scottish Cup campaign, but in contrast he was an integral part of the team which reached the same stage of the competition again in 1934, but this time lost to Rangers. That outcome would have been particularly disappointing for Miller personally, coming just after a defeat to England in what proved to be his last of five international appearances.

References

Sources

External links

London Hearts profile

Year of birth missing
Year of death missing
Scottish footballers
Footballers from Glasgow
Scotland international footballers
Scottish Junior Football Association players
Scottish Football League players
Clydebank F.C. (1914) players
Renfrew F.C. players
Yoker Athletic F.C. players
Petershill F.C. players
St Mirren F.C. players
Association football wing halves